The Richmond Metropolitan Fire Station, or Former Richmond Metropolitan Fire Station, at 131 Lord Street in Richmond, Victoria, a suburb of Melbourne, Australia is a historic fire station which was built in 1905–1910.

It was built as the Richmond branch of the Metropolitan Fire Brigade.  Its designer may have been MFB architect Percy Oakden.

It has a two-storey residential wing.

See also
Richmond Fire Station, built 1893, also in Richmond

References

Fire stations in Victoria (Australia)
Heritage-listed buildings in Melbourne
Fire stations completed in 1910
Buildings and structures in the City of Yarra
1910 establishments in Australia